The 1984 Svenska Cupen final took place on 20 June 1984 in Helsingborg. The match was contested by Allsvenskan side Malmö FF and Division 2 Södra side Landskrona BoIS. Landskrona played its first final since 1976 and its fourth final in total. Malmö FF played its first final since 1980 and its 14th final in total. Malmö FF won its 12th title with a 1–0 victory.

Match details

External links
Svenska Cupen at svenskfotboll.se

1984
Cupen
Malmö FF matches
Landskrona BoIS matches
June 1984 sports events in Europe
Sports competitions in Helsingborg
20th century in Skåne County